Padderbury Top is a hillfort about  south-east of Menheniot, in Cornwall, England, named after the hill on which it is situated. It is a scheduled monument.

Description
It is classed as a "defended settlement", being relatively small.

The enclosure is roughly circular. There are entrances on the west and east sides.

References

Hill forts in Cornwall
Scheduled monuments in Cornwall